Bunnlevel is an unincorporated community and census-designated place (CDP) along U.S. Highway 401 in Stewarts Creek Township, Harnett County, North Carolina, United States. The population was 552 at the 2010 census. It is a part of the Dunn Micropolitan Area, which is also a part of the greater Raleigh–Durham–Cary Combined Statistical Area (CSA) as defined by the United States Census Bureau.

History
Bunnlevel  was originally named "Bunn's Level" after a local resident Joseph Bunn who established the first  Post Office April 6, 1846. The community was later  incorporated in 1921 as "Bunnlevel" but has since been inactive as a municipality. Another incorporation movement here failed in 1961. Early prominent families included Elliott, McDougald, McNeill, McLean, Walker, Spears, Buie, Bunn, Byrd, Chance, Thomas, Hobbs and Hicks.

Thorbiskope was listed on the National Register of Historic Places in 1986.

Geography

Demographics

References

Census-designated places in Harnett County, North Carolina
Census-designated places in North Carolina
Unincorporated communities in North Carolina